Julia Sergeyevna Kutyukova (born March 30, 1989 in Lipetsk) is Russian volleyball player. The attacking. Captain VC Leningradka.

Julia  Kutyukova was born and started to practice volleyball in Lipetsk. Julia's mother - Marina Kutyukova - in 1995-2001 advocated volleyball team Indesit Lipetsk.

In the years 2003-2010 was the player Julia Kutyukova  VC Stinol (aka Indesit). Since 2008 he has performed for the first team.

In 2010-2012 - player  Fakel (Novy Urengoy), in 2012-2013 -  Severstal  (Cherepovets), 2013-2015 -  Omichka (Omsk). In 2015, she signed a contract with  Leningradka from St. Petersburg.

Bronze medalist Russia 2014 Silver medalist at the Cup of Russia in 2014 (top scorer of the final round of the draw).

In 2014, she made her debut in the national team of Russia. Its composition took part in two international tournaments -Montreux Volley Masters (3rd place) and  Boris Yeltsin Cup   (2nd place).

References

External links
 Julia S. Kutyukova

1989 births
Living people
Sportspeople from Lipetsk
Russian women's volleyball players
LGBT volleyball players